The U.S. Army Sniper Course trains selected military members assigned to sniper positions in the skills necessary to deliver long-range precision fire and the collection of battlefield information.  Students will receive training in fieldcraft skills, advanced camouflage techniques, concealed movement, target detection, range estimation, terrain utilization, intelligence preparation of the battlefield (IPB), relevant reporting procedures, sniper tactics, advanced marksmanship, and staff subjects (intelligence, mission, training, combat orders, command and control, and training management).

History
Although the US Army set up an advanced marksmanship course at Camp Perry, Ohio, the Army had no official sniper course during WWII. Between wars, the USMC sustained limited sniper training but not enough to compete with other countries during WWII.

During the Korean War, Snipers were used during the first recapture of Inchon, Seoul, and the Battle of Chosin. When the war went into its static period in 1951 the Army and Marines as in WW I and WW II were deadly, especially during this static defense period of the war. Fifty (.50) caliber weapons with scopes were also used for sniping purposes by the U.S. The favorite was a M2 .50 caliber machine gun with a target scope attached; due to the weight, this system was not very mobile. Major advances were implemented in sniper tactical mission planning, information gathering, harassing and delaying the enemy. The top sniper of Korea was Sgt Boindot from the U.S. Army with 70 confirmed kills. After the Korean War, the U.S. sniper program was again discontinued.

During 1955–1956, the Army Marksmanship Training Unit operated the first US Army Sniper School at Camp Perry, Ohio. Unfortunately a lack of understanding, and appreciation for the effectiveness and potential that snipers could add to the fight, caused sniper training to be abandoned after this short training period.

In Viet Nam, in July 1968, the US Army began centralized training in-country. The 9th Infantry Division established one of the first in-country Sniper Schools. The course, run by Major Willis Powell, lasted 18 days with the failure rate being 50%. In December 1968, a full complement of seventy-two snipers were ready for action.

The US Army Sniper School was established in 1987, at the Infantry Center at Fort Benning, GA, and continues to produce top-notch snipers today. Its continuous existence reflects the longest sniper training course in the history of the US Army and is a testament to the high priority sniper training now enjoys among the Army's leadership. Following the terrorist attacks on the World Trade Center buildings, the U.S. military entered into combat operations in Afghanistan under Operation Enduring Freedom. Snipers proved themselves as an invaluable asset due to their ability to engage targets at great distances in a mountainous battlefield.

The first woman has graduated from the US Army’s elite sniper school in 2021.”

Purpose
More than 300 Soldiers each year begin the seven-week U.S. Army Sniper School at Fort Benning, Georgia, but only the best of those will make it through the course to graduation. Army snipers face demanding missions and often operate with little or no support, and the training at Fort Benning tests their ability to work in isolation and under pressure.  

The Army Sniper Course trains selected individuals in the skills necessary to deliver long range precision fire and the collection of battlefield information. During the 7 week course, Soldiers will receive training in the application of fieldcraft; advanced camouflage techniques, concealed movement, target detection, range estimation, and terrain utilization (Macro and Micro), intelligence preparation of the battlefield (IPB), relevant reporting procedures, sniper tactics, advanced marksmanship; known and unknown distance firing, at stationary and moving targets during daylight and limited visibility in varying weather conditions, and staff subjects (intelligence, mission, training, combat orders, command and control, and training management) to ensure mission accomplishment without compromise in accordance with the supported unit Commanders intent in all operational venues.

The US Army's Maneuver Center of Excellence has released an updated Training Circular 3-22.10, Sniper, dated December 2017. The sniper training circular has been completely revised and updated in various topics to include; sniper planning, employment, field craft, marksmanship, ballistic programs, and complex engagements. The intent of this training circular was to create uniformity within the sniper community, and to align sniper training and employment with current U.S. Army doctrine.

In 2018, the United States Army Sniper Course changed their course Program of Instruction (POI) to focus on how the sniper can be utilized in large scale, ground combat warfare. After a course revision, the cadre and leadership concluded that Army snipers need to focus on acting as sensors, communicators and human weapons systems, supporting enhanced multi-domain command and control from the ground in anti-access/area denial environments.

Notable Army Snipers
 U.S. Army SGT Christopher Dale Abbott: As part of a U.S. Army Counter IED team (CIEDT) in Iraq in 2007–2008, he recorded 22 confirmed kills with an M24 7.62×51mm NATO rifle for a period of only 7 months before being injured and sent out of theater. He and his team were tasked with seeking out insurgents placing IEDs along frequently used Main Supply Routes and Alternate Supply Routes.
 U.S. Army Staff Sergeant Timothy L. Kellner – regarded as one of the top snipers still active in the U.S. Army, with 139 confirmed kills during the Iraq War and 3 in Haiti.
 U.S. Army Staff Sergeant Justin Morales – As part of the U.S. Army CIST (Counter Insurgent Sniper Team) in Iraq, he recorded 27 confirmed kills with an M24 7.62×51mm NATO rifle. From 2005 to 2006, Morales and his team in Balad, Iraq were tasked with seeking out insurgents placing IEDs along Main Supply Routes and Alternate Supply Routes.
 Adelbert F. Waldron III (Vietnam War) – achieved 109 confirmed kills.
 Master Sgt. Gary Gordon and Sgt. First Class Randy Shughart (Somalia: Operation Gothic Serpent) – were Delta Force snipers who were awarded the Medal of Honor for their fatal attempt to protect the injured crew of a downed helicopter during the Battle of Mogadishu. This action was later dramatized in the film Black Hawk Down.

Other schools
After graduating the basic course, US Army Snipers are given the opportunity to obtain a variety of other courses to further refine their skills.
 Urban Snipers
 High Angle (Mountain) Snipers
 Snipers Team leader course (U.S. Marine Corps)
 Foreign Forces Snipers Schools
 British Royal Marine Snipers School
 Israeli Foreign Forces Snipers School

See also
 United States Marine Corps Scout Sniper
 Sniper
 Designated marksman
 Marksman
 Scout
 Related military roles
 Jäger (military)
 Skirmisher
 Marksmanship badges (United States)
 Hog's tooth
 Intelligence, surveillance, target acquisition, and reconnaissance
 Related military operations
 Operation Foxley – plan to kill Adolf Hitler using a sniper
 Sniper Alley
 Snipers of the Soviet Union
 Special forces
 Related military weapons
 Anti-materiel rifle
 Anti-tank rifle
 Sniper rifle

References

External links
 United States Army Sniper School
 Army Sniper School at About.com.
 Sniper students make the grade – The Bayonet
 Snipers Bring School to Iraqi Desert – DefenseLink

Sniper warfare
United States Army schools
Sniper Course